In its 138-year history, the Philadelphia Phillies baseball franchise of Major League Baseball's National League has employed 55 managers. The duties of the team manager include team strategy and leadership on and off the field. Of those 52 managers, 15 have been "player-managers"; specifically, they managed the team while still being signed as a player.

The Phillies posted their franchise record for losses in a season during their record-setting streak of 16 consecutive losing seasons (a season where the winning percentage is below .500), with 111 losses out of 154 games in 1941. During this stretch from 1933 to 1948, the Phillies employed seven managers, all of whom posted a winning percentage below .430 for their Phillies careers. Seven managers have taken the Phillies to the postseason, with Danny Ozark and Charlie Manuel leading the team to three playoff appearances. Dallas Green and Charlie Manuel are the only Phillies managers to win a World Series: Green in the 1980 World Series against the Kansas City Royals; and Manuel in the 2008 World Series against the Tampa Bay Rays. Gene Mauch is the longest-tenured manager in franchise history, with 1,332 games of service in parts of nine seasons (1960–1968). Manuel surpassed Mauch for the most victories as a manager in franchise history on September 28, 2011, with a 13-inning defeat of the Atlanta Braves; it was the team's final victory in their franchise-record 102-win season.

The manager with the highest winning percentage over a full season or more was Arthur Irwin, whose .575 winning percentage is fourth on the all-time wins list for Phillies managers. Conversely, the worst winning percentage over a season in franchise history is .160 by the inaugural season's second manager Blondie Purcell, who posted a 13–68 record during the 1883 season.


Table key

 Managers 

Statistics current through November 6th, 2022 
Footnotes
#: A running total of the number of Phillies' managers. Thus, any manager who has two or more separate terms is only counted once.

See also
List of Philadelphia Phillies owners and executives, including general managers

References
General references

Inline citations

External links
Official website of the Philadelphia Phillies

 
Philadelphia Phillies
Manager